Robert Bowles may refer to:

Robert Bowles (soldier) (1744–1812), Major general in Bombay Army
Robert Bowles (karate), American karate teacher, founder of the International Shuri-ryū Association